National Highway 527C, commonly referred to as NH 527C is a national highway in  India. It is a spur road of National Highway 27. NH-527C traverses the state of Bihar in India.

Route 
Majhauli, Katra, Jajuar, Pupri, Charout.

Junctions  

  Terminal near Majhauli.
  Terminal near Charout.

See also 

 List of National Highways in India
 List of National Highways in India by state

References

External links 

 NH 527C on OpenStreetMap

National highways in India
National Highways in Bihar